The 2004 WNBA season was the eighth season for the Houston Comets. The Comets missed the playoffs for the first time in franchise history.

Offseason

Dispersal Draft
Based on the Comets' 2003 record, they would pick 8th and 11th in the Cleveland Rockers dispersal draft. The Comets picked Pollyanna Johns Kimbrough and Lucienne Berthieu.

WNBA Draft

Regular season

Season standings

Season schedule

Player stats

References

Houston Comets seasons
Houston
Houston